Shefford can mean the following:

Shefford, Bedfordshire, a town in Bedfordshire, England
Shefford Town F.C., the football (soccer) club based in that town
Great Shefford, a village in Berkshire, England
Shefford, Quebec, a township in Eastern Quebec, Canada
Shefford County, Quebec, a historic county in Quebec
Shefford (electoral district), a federal electoral district in Southern Quebec
Shefford (provincial electoral district), a provincial electoral district also in Southern Quebec